Evans Woollen (November 28, 1864 – May 20, 1942) was an American lawyer, banker, political figure, and college football coach.

Education, coaching career, and banking career

Woollen graduated from Yale University in 1886 with a bachelor's degree and received a master's degree from Yale in 1889.

In 1886 he taught the first Wabash College football team how to play the game. In 1889 he served as head coach at Indiana University. His career college football record is 2–2–1.

In 1912, Woollen founded the Fletcher Savings and Trust Company.

Political career
Woolen ran unsuccessfully for the United States House of Representatives in 1896 and the United States Senate in 1926.  Woollen was a candidate for the Democratic nomination in the United States presidential election of 1928, in which he won only his own state of Indiana and failed to capture the nomination.

Head coaching record

References

External links
 
 

1864 births
1942 deaths
20th-century American politicians
Indiana Hoosiers football coaches
Candidates in the 1928 United States presidential election
Wabash Little Giants football coaches
Yale University alumni
Sportspeople from Indianapolis
Coaches of American football from Indiana
Indiana lawyers